The Tent Dwellers is a book by Albert Bigelow Paine, chronicling his travels through inland Nova Scotia on a trout fishing trip with Dr. Edward "Eddie" Breck, and with guides Charles "the Strong" (Charlie Charlton of Milford, NS) and Del "the Stout" (Del Thomas of Milford, NS), one June in the early 1900s. 
Originally published in 1908, The story starts at what is now known as the Legendary Milford House; Renowned author Albert Bigelow Paine, (Mark Twain’s biographer), chronicled his first impression of the Milford House Lodge in his famous book, in the following way … "Then at last came a church, a scattering string of houses, a neat white hotel and the edge of the wilderness had been reached."  Those travelling today from Annapolis Royal will witness little change in the scenery or the impact from this turn of the century description. The book takes place in what is now Kejimkujik National Park (or "Kedgeemakoogee", as Paine spelled it) and the adjacent Tobeatic Game Reserve. The Reserve later became the Tobeatic Wildlife Management Area, and in 1998 was included within the newly created Tobeatic Wilderness Area.

Paine was well known in American literary circles at the time, chiefly as the biographer of Mark Twain.  Breck held a PhD, spoke five languages, and was listed in Who's Who in America.

Summary
The book chronicles a three-week fishing trip through central Nova Scotia, and is an excellent account of the unspoiled Nova Scotia wilderness that existed at the time, which has been largely diminished since.  The group encounters moose (which Eddie tries to capture and bring back alive), beaver, and numerous trout, the first of which is now very scarce in the region, and legions of mosquitos, moose flies, black flies, noseeums, and midges, all of which are regrettably abundant to this day.

Many of the areas described in the book, then virtually unexplored and uncharted, are now well known to back-country campers in Kejimkujik Park and the Tobeatic Wilderness Area.  The descriptions of the central Nova Scotia woods contained in the book are beautifully written and uncannily accurate, and while the trout which brought Paine and Breck to Nova Scotia are less abundant, due in part to acid rain and increased fishing pressure, they still provide good sport for anglers.

Paine, a famous New England novelist and biographer, initially had some difficulties with the lack of modern amenities in camp life, but soon came to love the rugged beauty and solitude of the woods.  As advice to other potential campers, he has this to offer:

"...if you are willing to get wet and stay wet - to get cold and stay cold - to be bruised, and scuffed, and bitten - to be hungry and thirsty, and to have your muscles strained and sore from unusual taxation: if you will welcome all these things, not once, but many times, for the sake of moments of pure triumph and that larger luxury which comes with the comfort of the camp and the conquest of the wilderness, then go!

The wilderness will welcome you, and teach you, and take you to its heart. And you will find your own soul there; and the discovery will be worth while!"

Gear in The Tent Dwellers
The gear described in the book would today be considered antique.  Birchbark canoes are used throughout the book, as well as canvas tents.  Large sections are devoted to the fishing gear used, specifically the fishing rods and flies.

Ecology in The Tent Dwellers
In many places The Tent Dwellers draws attention to ecological impact on the forest.  Paine derisively describes the 'fish hog' as one who catches and kills more fish than he has use for.  He writes about the marks left on the land by logging, and about the necessity of always leaving part of the land wild and uninhabited.  On the beaver, which was then being trapped nearly to extinction, he wrote:

"Long ago he taught men how to build their houses and dams, and to save up food and water for a dry time. Even if we no longer need him, he deserves our protection and our tender regard."

In advocating sustainable and responsible use of forest lands, Paine was ahead of his time.  The regions through which Paine and Breck made their journey are now encompassed by Kejimkujik National Park and Tobeatic Wilderness Area.

Although fish, deer, beaver and porcupines still abound within this area, the moose referred to many times in this book (Alces americana) is endangered and rarely can be seen in this part of Nova Scotia.

Lake Rossignol and the surrounding lakes have changed considerably since this book was written.  The outlet to the lake was dammed in 1929, so that Rossignol has expanded to encompass several smaller, formerly separate lakes.

References

External links
 Official Parks Canada site for Kejimkujik National Park
 digital copy of The Tent Dwellers
 Nova Scotia Natural Resources - Mainland Moose

1908 non-fiction books
American travel books
Books about Canada
Mass media in Nova Scotia
Novels set in Nova Scotia